Färlöv is a locality situated in Kristianstad Municipality, Skåne County, Sweden with 1,026 inhabitants in 2010.

Färlöv is best known for Färlöv Church, a Romanesque 12th century church with twin towers.

Being a small town, Färlöv does not have much more than a church, a kindergarten, an elementary school, a filling station/convenience store, and a pizza restaurant. The rest of the town is made up of dwellings for people who work in Kristianstad.

References 

Populated places in Kristianstad Municipality
Populated places in Skåne County